is a name for a Shinto shrine connected to the Imperial House of Japan.

List of Jingū 
The following list encompasses only some, but not all of the Heian period Nijūnisha shrines (Twenty-Two Shrines); and the modern shrines which were established after the Meiji Restoration are not omitted. In the list below, these shrines are marked with "‡".  

 Ise Grand Shrine
 Akama Shrine
 Atsuta Shrine
 Heian Shrine‡
 Hikosan Shrine
 Hinokuma Shrine
 Hokkaidō Shrine
 Isonokami Shrine
 Izanagi Shrine‡
 Kagoshima Shrine
 Kashihara Shrine
 Kashima Shrine
 Katori Shrine
 Kehi Shrine
 Kirishima Shrine
 Meiji Shrine‡
 Minase Shrine
 Miyazaki Shrine
 Omi Shrine
 Shiramine Shrine
 Udo Shrine
 Usa Shrine
 Yoshino Shrine

Ise Grand Shrine is also known by the formal name Jingū with no further designation.

Defunct shrines
 Chōsen Jingū
 Kantō Jingū (extinct)

See also
List of Shinto shrines
List of Tōshō-gū

Notes

References
 Ponsonby-Fane, Richard Arthur Brabazon. Ponsonby-Fane, Richard. (1956).  Kyoto: The Old Capital of Japan, 794-1869. Kyoto: Ponsonby Memorial Society. OCLC 36644
 . (1959).  The Imperial House of Japan. Kyoto: Ponsonby Memorial Society. OCLC 194887
 . (1962).   Studies in Shinto and Shrines. Kyoto: Ponsonby Memorial Society. OCLC 399449
 . (1963).  Vicissitudes of Shinto. Kyoto: Ponsonby Memorial Society. OCLC 36655

 
Lists of religious buildings and structures in Japan
Lists of Shinto shrines